East Williston is an incorporated village in the Town of North Hempstead in Nassau County, on Long Island, in New York, United States. The population was 2,556 at the 2010 census.

History 
Most of the farmland was owned by the Willis family in the 1800s. To be confused with the Willis areas of upstate New York, this area was known as East Williston. The original borders of the area known as East Williston stretched west towards Queens to Herricks Road, north to I.U. Willets Road, south to the Village of Mineola, and east to Bacon Road in Old Westbury.

The coming of the railroad in 1865 stimulated manufacturing in East Williston. The industries that grew as a result of the new train station included brick making, windmill making and carriage making. Henry M. Willis designed and built the popular East Williston Runabout Roadcart. This carriage had two wheels and two seats. Its soft suspension allowed comfortable travel over the rough roads of the time. There was also a feature which allowed the body to be locked to the axle, allowing the carriage to be used on the racetrack. Over 1,000 East Williston Runabout Roadcarts were built by Oakley and Griffin (who purchased the business from Willis in 1889).

The major east-west route, State Route 25B or Hillside Avenue, was formerly called East Williston Avenue, since it connected Queens with East Williston.The East Williston Union Free School District was founded in 1955. In 1985, the residential and commercial core of East Williston collectively known as the East Williston Village Historic District was designated a national historic district and listed on the National Register of Historic Places.

Although originally called Williston, the name of the area was changed to East Williston in 1879, when locals requested the United States Postal Service to open a local post office. Since there was already a community with a post office in Upstate New York using the name, locals added the word "East" to their community's name; the name East Williston was in use for both this village and what is now the adjacent village of Williston Park.

In 1926, this eastern half of East Williston incorporated as a village. Its western half, Williston Park, incorporated separately that same year due to how both had very different characteristics.

Geography

Demographics

As of the census of 2000, there were 2,503 people, 833 households, and 717 families residing in the village. The population density was 4,447.5 people per square mile (1,725.7/km2). There were 846 housing units at an average density of 1,503.2 per square mile (583.3/km2). The racial makeup of the village was 95.25% White, 0.36% African American, 0.04% Native American, 3.36% Asian, 0.08% Pacific Islander, 0.24% from other races, and 0.68% from two or more races. Hispanic or Latino of any race were 2.36% of the population.

There were 833 households, out of which 42.5% had children under the age of 18 living with them, 77.4% were married couples living together, 6.4% had a female householder with no husband present, and 13.9% were non-families. 12.7% of all households were made up of individuals, and 8.8% had someone living alone who was 65 years of age or older. The average household size was 3.00 and the average family size was 3.29.

In the village, the population was spread out, with 28.2% under the age of 18, 5.8% from 18 to 24, 22.7% from 25 to 44, 27.8% from 45 to 64, and 15.5% who were 65 years of age or older. The median age was 41 years. For every 100 females, there were 95.4 males. For every 100 females age 18 and over, there were 90.7 males.

The median income for a household in the village was $109,111, and the median income for a family was $118,611. Males had a median income of $90,952 versus $44,861 for females. The per capita income for the village was $50,484. About 1.4% of families and 1.7% of the population were below the poverty line, including 2.6% of those under age 18 and 1.0% of those age 65 or over.

Notable people
 Carol Alt, supermodel and actress
 Michael Balboni, former NYS Senator 7th District, former Director of NYS Office of Homeland Security
 John D. Caemmerer (1928-1982), lawyer and politician who served in the New York Senate.
 Jack Kirby, comic book artist, co-creator of Captain America, the X-Men, the Fantastic Four and numerous other characters.
 Carol Leifer, writer and comedian
 Christopher Masterson, actor
 Danny Masterson, actor
 Maureen Ryan O'Connell, former NYS Assemblywoman 17th District, Nassau County Clerk
 Joseph Schindelman, illustrator of original US edition of Charlie and The Chocolate Factory, by Roald Dahl.

References

External links
 Official website

Town of North Hempstead, New York
Villages in New York (state)
Villages in Nassau County, New York